Günther Merkel is a retired East German slalom canoeist who competed from the late 1950s to the late 1960s. He won seven medals at the ICF Canoe Slalom World Championships with six golds (C-2: 1961, 1963, 1965, C-2 team: 1961, 1963, 1967) and a silver (Mixed C-2: 1959).

See also
Manfred Merkel

References

German male canoeists
Possibly living people
Year of birth missing (living people)
Medalists at the ICF Canoe Slalom World Championships